Lehigh River Gorge is a gorge in the Lehigh Gorge State Park, Luzerne & Carbon County, Pennsylvania.

Landforms of Luzerne County, Pennsylvania
Landforms of Carbon County, Pennsylvania
Canyons and gorges of Pennsylvania